Rico Dean Scott Richards (born 27 September 2003) is an English professional footballer who plays as a midfielder for  club West Bromwich Albion and the England national under-18 team.

Club career
Richards joined the youth academy of West Bromwich Albion as a seven year old, and signed his first professional contract with the club on 4 August 2020. He made his debut for the club on 25 August 2021, starting in a 6–0 EFL Cup second round defeat to Arsenal.

He made his league debut for the club on 3 March 2023, coming on as a substitute in the 80th minute in a 2-0 loss away at Hull.

International career
Born in England, Richards is of Jamaican descent. He has represented England at under-16 and under-17 international levels.

Career statistics

Honours 
West Bromwich Albion U23

 Premier League Cup winner: 2021–22

References

External links

West Brom profile

2003 births
Living people
English footballers
English sportspeople of Jamaican descent
Sportspeople from West Bromwich
Association football midfielders
West Bromwich Albion F.C. players
England youth international footballers